Tomáš Záborský (born 14 November 1987) is a Slovak professional ice hockey left winger currently playing for HK Poprad of the Slovak Extraliga.

Playing career
Drafted in the 5th round, 137th overall by the New York Rangers in the 2006 NHL Entry Draft, in the 2006 CHL Import Draft, Zaborsky was selected 36th overall by the Saginaw Spirit.

He spent his entire OHL career with the Saginaw Spirit. Zaborsky has also played professionally in Slovakia with HC Dukla Trenčín. He has played in the ECHL for the Charlotte Checkers and Dayton Bombers, and spent time in the AHL with the Hartford Wolfpack, the New York Rangers' AHL affiliate. Since the 2009–2010 he is playing in Pori, Finland, playing for Ässät. Zaborsky was named the European Hockey Player of the Month by eurohockey.com in September 2011. In 2012, he signed a two-year contract with Avangard Omsk.

On 26 April 2019, Záborský left Tappara after two seasons and opted to continue his professional career in the Liiga, agreeing to a two-year contract as a free agent with SaiPa.

Career statistics

Regular season and playoffs

International

Transactions
24 June 2006 – Drafted in the 5th round, 137th overall by the New York Rangers in the 2006 NHL Entry Draft
19 July 2010 – Traded from the New York Rangers to the Anaheim Ducks for Defenseman Matt McCue

References

External links

1987 births
Living people
Ässät players
Avangard Omsk players
HC Bílí Tygři Liberec players
Brynäs IF players
Charlotte Checkers (1993–2010) players
Dayton Bombers players
Hartford Wolf Pack players
HK Dukla Trenčín players
HIFK (ice hockey) players
Ice hockey players at the 2014 Winter Olympics
New York Rangers draft picks
Olympic ice hockey players of Slovakia
HK 95 Panthers Považská Bystrica players
SaiPa players
Saginaw Spirit players
Salavat Yulaev Ufa players
Schwenninger Wild Wings players
Slovak ice hockey left wingers
Sportspeople from Trenčín
Tappara players
HK Poprad players
Slovak expatriate ice hockey players in the United States
Slovak expatriate ice hockey players in Russia
Slovak expatriate ice hockey players in Finland
Slovak expatriate ice hockey players in Germany
Slovak expatriate ice hockey players in the Czech Republic
Slovak expatriate ice hockey players in Sweden